Cerithium ophioderma is a species of sea snail, a marine gastropod mollusk in the family Cerithiidae.

Distribution
The distribution of Cerithium ophioderma includes the Western Central Pacific.
 Philippines
 Japan

References

 Habe T. (1968). A new cerithiid species from Japan. Venus. 27(3): 87-88
 Spencer, H.G., Marshall, B.A. & Willan, R.C. (2009). Checklist of New Zealand living Mollusca. Pp 196-219. in: Gordon, D.P. (ed.) New Zealand inventory of biodiversity. Volume one. Kingdom Animalia: Radiata, Lophotrochozoa, Deuterostomia. Canterbury University Press, Christchurch
 Hasegawa K. (2017). Family Cerithiidae. Pp. 788-793, in: T. Okutani (ed.), Marine Mollusks in Japan, ed. 2. 2 vols. Tokai University Press. 1375 pp.

External links
 Houbrick R.S. (1992). Monograph of the genus Cerithium Bruguière in the Indo-Pacific (Cerithiidae: Prosobranchia). Smithsonian Contributions to Zoology. 510: 1-211.

Cerithiidae
Gastropods described in 1968